Clive Anthony Ulyate (11 December 1933 – 18 March 2018) was a South African sportsman who played international rugby union for South Africa. He also played first-class cricket, provincial hockey and provincial squash.

Rugby union career
Ulyate, a fly-half, played his early rugby at Hilton College, before moving on to the University of Witwatersrand RFC. He would later play provincially for Transvaal. He was capped four times for South Africa during the British Lions tour of South Africa in 1955. In the Test in Port Elizabeth, which the Springboks won, Ulyate scored a try and kicked a drop goal. He played three further Tests for South Africa, in their 1956 tour of New Zealand.

Test history 

Legend: try (3 pts); pen = penalty (3 pts.); conv = conversion (2 pts.), dg = dropgoal (3 pts.).

Cricket career
He was an all-rounder on the cricket field and played four first-class matches. His first appearance was in the 1955/56 Currie Cup season, playing for Transvaal against Natal. He had minimal impact on the match but did claim the wicket of Test opener Trevor Goddard. It was until 1964, with Eastern Province, that he played another first-class match. He played once for Eastern Province in 1964/65 and then appeared twice for them in the 1965/66 Currie Cup. His best performance came in the 1964/65 fixture, which was against North Eastern Transvaal. He scored the only half-century of his career, 55, in the first innings and then took 3/58.

See also
List of South Africa national rugby union players – Springbok no. 315

References

1933 births
2018 deaths
South African rugby union players
South Africa international rugby union players
Golden Lions players
South African cricketers
Gauteng cricketers
Eastern Province cricketers
Alumni of Hilton College (South Africa)
Rugby union players from Johannesburg
Rugby union fly-halves
White South African people